Emilia is a play by Morgan Lloyd Malcolm inspired by the life of the 17th century poet and feminist Emilia Bassano, as well as her speculated role as William Shakespeare's "Dark Lady."

Synopsis 
Four hundred years ago, Emilia Bassano wanted her voice to be heard. It wasn't. Could she have been the 'Dark Lady' of Shakespeare's sonnets? What of her own poetry? Why was her story erased from history?

Production history 
The play was commissioned for the Shakespeare's Globe where it opened from 10 August 2018 running until 1 September. The production featured an all-female cast and was directed by Nicole Charles.

Following the run at the Globe, the production was announced to transfer into the West End at the Vaudeville Theatre from 8 March 2019. The limited run was due to end on 15 June, however it was announced that it would be closing two weeks early on 1 June 2019.

On 27 June 2019, Nick Hern Books announced that the play was available to be performed by all-female casts in UK educational institutions.

From 4 to 22 March 2020, the play ran as part of the farewell Anthony Harper Pop-up Globe season in Auckland, New Zealand, directed by Miriama McDowell.

In October 2020, it was announced that an archive recording of the 2019 West End production would be available to watch online between 10 and 24 November 2020 to support the theatre industry during the COVID-19 pandemic. This date was later extended to December 2nd.

In October 2021, a production of the play directed by Karen Tomlin ran for a week at the Barbican Centre's Milton Court Theatre in London.

Awards and nominations

West End production

References 

2018 plays
British plays
West End plays
Laurence Olivier Award-winning plays
Plays based on real people
Plays set in the 17th century
Plays set in London
Cultural depictions of William Shakespeare